"Amor a Medias" is a Latin pop song recorded by American duo Ha*Ash. It was released on June 8, 2005 as the first of the single from their second studio album Mundos Opuestos (2005) and then included on their live album Ha*Ash: En Vivo (2019).

Background and release 
"Amor a Medias" was written by Áureo Baqueiro and Salvador Rizo and produced by Baqueiro. Is a song recorded by American duo Ha*Ash from her second studio album "Mundos Opuestos" (2005). It was released as the lead single from the album on June 8, 2005, by Sony Music Entertainment.

Commercial performance 
The track peaked at number 4 in the Monitor Latino charts in the Mexico.

Music video 
A music video for "Amor a Medias" was released in June, 2005. Was published on her YouTube channel on October 25, 2009. It was directed by Gustavo Garzón. , the video has over 38 million views on YouTube.

The second music video for "Amor a Medias" recorded live for his album A Tiempo edition deluxe (DVD) was released on 2012.

The third video for "Amor a Medias", recorded live for the live album Ha*Ash: En Vivo, was released on December 6, 2019. The video was filmed in Auditorio Nacional, Mexico City.

Credits and personnel 
Credits adapted from AllMusic and Genius.

Recording and management

 Recording Country: United States
 Sony / ATV Discos Music Publishing LLC / Westwood Publishing
 (P) 2005 Sony Music Entertainment México, S.A. De C.V.

Ha*Ash
 Ashley Grace  – vocals, guitar
 Hanna Nicole  – vocals, guitar 
Additional personnel
 Áureo Baqueiro  – songwriting, recording engineer, arranger, director 
 Salvador Rizo  – songwriting.
 Gerardo García  – guitar, acoustic guitar, mandoline.
 Tommy Morgan  – harmonica.
 Gabe Witcher  – violin.

Charts

Release history

References 

Ha*Ash songs
2005 songs
2005 singles
Songs written by Áureo Baqueiro
Songs written by Salvador Rizo
Song recordings produced by Áureo Baqueiro
Spanish-language songs
Pop ballads
Sony Music Latin singles
2000s ballads